The Click Five (often abbreviated as TC5) was an American rock band from Boston, Massachusetts. The original members, most of them students at Berklee College of Music, started on January 1, 2004, and played in various local venues. They then quickly got the attention of talent scout Wayne Sharp (who had worked with the power pop group Candy). The Click Five made their first recording, a two-song demo session, in early 2004 after successful local touring. They released their debut album Greetings from Imrie House in 2005. After vocalist Eric Dill left the group, he was replaced by Kyle Patrick who debuted on their second album Modern Minds and Pastimes in 2007. Their third album, TCV, was released in Asia in 2010 and to the rest of the world in early 2011.

The band was initially known for its power pop songs and for its Mod-based public image, involving sharp-looking suits and ties coupled with moptop haircuts, which is deliberately reminiscent of the Beatles or the Dave Clark Five. They prefer to classify their music as "new school power pop". However, they have also been classified as pop punk and teen pop. They achieved significant commercial success with their first album in the US and their second release met with extreme popularity in Asian countries such as Cambodia and the Philippines. In total, the band has sold two million albums worldwide and have created eight number one singles in seven different nations. The band starred in the 2007 film Taking Five with Alona Tal, Daniella Monet, and Christy Carlson Romano.

History

Formation and early history
Ben Romans studied songwriting, Ethan Mentzer studied production and engineering, and Joey Zehr double majored in production/engineering and business at the Berklee College of Music. Roommates and close-friends Mentzer and Zehr moved to a place on Imrie Road in the neighborhood of Allston when they were both sophomores. Calling their place "Imrie House", they met with Romans and Joe Guese (whom Zehr once described as a "professional dropout") and formed a kind of pseudo-fraternity. The four played in various local bands, none of which had any success. However, they drew the attention of Wayne Sharp, a musical talent agent who had mostly worked in jazz although he had also worked with the mid-1980s power pop group Candy. Early iterations of the band often also included studio musician Jude (Freebird) Jones until Dill's departure in 2007.

Romans went to work for a record company in Nashville. Jeff Dorenfeld, former manager of the band Boston, saw Guese and Mentzer performing in May 2003 and referred them to Sharp. Sharp liked their playing, but he had a low regard for their songs and their appearance. The first words Sharp ever said to them were "This isn't going to work unless you listen to me".

The four soon took in Eric Dill, a high-school friend of Zehr from when they both lived in Indianapolis. Zehr has said that they began playing seriously because "[w]hen we started the band our senior year, it was basically our last-ditch effort, because we all knew we were about to be done with school and have to enter the real world". They were all in their very early-20s. According to Zehr, the group would play several shows a week that were booked under different band names to get around local clubs' rules preventing artists from playing that close to each other. Their playing then got the attention of Mike Denneen, Boston-based producer of Fountains of Wayne, who agreed to help them produce a 2-song demo record. Denneen also introduced them to Kiss guitarist Paul Stanley, who was strongly supportive.

The Click Five made their demos at Imrie House itself, finishing in March 2004. Denneen believed that the group "sucked live" and pushed them to rehearse further. The program director at Kiss 108, the big Boston Top 40 station, liked it enough to book the group for the station's "Concert on the Charles" in mid-2004. The released their first EP, "Angel to You (Devil to Me)", around this time. Principal songwriter Ben Romans collaborated with Paul Stanley in creating the song, and guitarist Elliot Easton, best known for his work in the Cars, played in it.

The group hired a lawyer and shopped around some of the major labels. A college scout from Epic Records who witnessed one of their shows convinced Epic to fly the group to Los Angeles to play. Lava Records, which was later folded into Atlantic Records, ended up signing the band in late 2004. They started with the label a mere month after their EP. According to The Boston Globe, "Click Five was launched into the pop-music stratosphere with the full force of the industry's muscle behind it." The band opened for Ashlee Simpson for the first time, a position that cost the label $25,000 and that one of their officials later called "the best money we've spent".

The group ended up selling about 10,000 copies of the EP. They then released "Just the Girl", written by label-mate Adam Schlesinger of Fountains of Wayne, to build up support for their debut album. They also toured extensively with Ashlee Simpson. They released their debut, Greetings From Imrie House, on August 8, 2005, which they named after the building where they had started. It featured another song by Schlesinger titled "I'll Take My Chances", in which Elliot Easton also played. The album also contained a cover version of "Lies" – a song which was a hit for UK pop band Thompson Twins in 1983.

Commercial and critical peak

The album brought widespread commercial success, selling 350,000 copies in the United States. It took the fifteenth place on the Billboard 200 Charts almost immediately. According to The Boston Globe, they "saturated" the media in several Asian countries as well, such as in Cambodia. Amy Doyle, then-MTV vice president, remarked that "I see screaming girls in their future. I see them having to wear disguises". Many stores stocked various Click Five-based items such as lunchboxes, backpacks, trading cards, and hair gel lines. The band spent late 2005 and early 2006 as the opening act for Ashlee Simpson, Alanis Morissette, the Backstreet Boys, and Jesse McCartney as well as touring both by itself and in collaboration with Big City Rock. They also performed at Macy's Thanksgiving Day Parade in November 2005, singing "Catch Your Wave".

Their album turned out as that year's highest-charting debut from a new rock group. They created a music video for "Just the Girl" in summer 2005, and it went up to number three on MTV's program Total Request Live. The song became the No. 1 most-downloaded song on iTunes for over 2 weeks, leading to a RIAA platinum certification as a Digital Single. Their MySpace page hit No. 1 on the "Most Viewed Band Page" ranking as well.

Greetings from Imrie House gathered positive reviews from About.com, where critic Bill Lamb labeled it "a free fall into the world of irresistible melody and guitar-soaked power chords", and from Entertainment Weekly, where critic Gary Susman called it "insanely catchy". Rolling Stone also ran a supportive review from Barry Walters, who stated that the "relentlessly catchy" album featured "several hit-worthy tracks". Critics at USA Today and IGN.com panned the album, the former stating that listeners will be left "craving something more".

Throughout, members saw manager Wayne Sharp as an amiable influence. Producer Mike Denneen said, "He's not a dictator; he's a consensus builder, and he's very good at it... He cajoles and persuades and convinces and everybody is inclined to trust him, including me." However, band members expressed concern that they started out too fast and that they intentionally brought on too much media attention. Members also experienced increasing dissatisfaction with their label. Zehr said, "It's not like the old days, where a label would spend years pumping money to develop an artist... Today it's up to the artists to ready themselves for the big time". He commented as well, "At this point you're kind of turning the label into a bank".

Later career and recent history
Through 2006, interest in the band gradually faded. Their songs did not have the chart success that the members had expected. Allmusic critic Stephen Thomas Erlewine has remarked that the band's music "didn't quite stick in the brain". Bassist Ethan Mentzer later said, "There was a point where it felt like we were in an airplane and the engines just died... It was a long, slow glide down." The band went on touring locally in venues such as Hot Stove and Cool Music.

Lead singer Eric Dill left the band in February 2007. The remaining four members released an official statement on the departure in March on their MySpace page, stating that "We know he will be missed by many and we wish him the best success in his other endeavors". They brought on new lead singer Kyle Patrick, whom they had met in November 2006. Patrick had been in his third year at the Berklee College of Music and left in the middle of his studies to join the Click Five as Lead Vocalist/Rhythm Guitarist. He had been performing since age 11, citing Eric Clapton and his bands Derek & the Dominos and Cream, Stevie Ray Vaughan, and James Taylor as his main influences.

Click Five spent early 2007 undergoing a reboot of their musical style, emphasizing new wave and deliberately retro influences with more use of synthesizers. They appeared to be emulating successful alternative rock groups the Killers and Weezer, according to Erlewine. The band also gave up wearing matching outfits and changed to having each member adopt their own modified visual image. When playing songs originally sung by Eric Dill live, they lowered the keys a whole step to suit Kyle Patrick's deeper voice.

The band narrowed down the about eighty songs that they had been working on down to twelve and then recorded their second album, Modern Minds and Pastimes.  The title was a reference to Ray Charles' 1962 album "Modern Sounds in Country and Western Music". It was released on June 26, 2007. Despite high hopes, the album failed to meet commercial expectations, with only 50,000 copies sold in the U.S. It reached number 136 on the Billboard 200 chart. The album also earned mixed reviews from Erlewine, which stated that "it's hard not to be disappointed", and Adrienne Day of Entertainment Weekly, which called the lyrics "banal" and the overall album as lacking "punch". Chad Grischow of IGN.com labeled it "unfortunately uneven", although he also remarked that it was "worth a listen".

The album spawned the single "Jenny" (co- written by Jez Ashurst and Chris Braide), which reached the number one spot in charts in Indonesia, the Philippines, Thailand, Singapore, and Taiwan. The group spent mid to late 2007 touring across various Asian venues, many of them alongside the Black Eyed Peas. The group performed on Fox Network's Good Day Atlanta on August 30. The group performed at Boston Music Awards on Saturday, December 1, 2007 at the Orpheum Theater. They received nominations for "Outstanding Pop Act", "Male Vocalist of the Year" (for Kyle Patrick), and "Song of the Year", and they won for "Outstanding Pop Act". Singapore radio station 98.7 FM voted them "Band of the Year".

The group continued touring to widely receptive audiences in some Asian countries, notably in the Philippines where they have a loyal fan base, throughout 2008. That year, they co-headlined the first rock concert ever performed at the Angkor Wat Temple. In late 2008, they participated in an MTV EXIT concert in Bangkok done to raise awareness on human trafficking. The band played along with Burmese pop star Phyu Phyu Kyaw Thein and various Thai-based celebrities.

On August 2, 2008, Click Five won the "Knockout Award" at MTV Asia Awards 2008, in Genting Highlands, Malaysia. The award, for "the artist who has successfully captured the hearts of young music audiences in Asia", was a surprise to the band. Through 2008 and early 2009, the band played in various smaller, more niche-based venues in the New England area around this time.

In March 2009, Mike Denneen said, "Atlantic was unwilling to let them become a 'real' band, which is what the guys wanted. Now they're calling the shots and having the opportunity to do what most bands do at the beginning: play and write songs and develop." The band spent the month playing in various local locations such as the Lizard Lounge in Boston. They represented a big change for the Lounge, which was used to hosting alternative rock and indie rock acts. Ben Romans stated that month that a self-financed new album would be coming soon. The band released two new songs, "I Quit! I Quit! I Quit!" and "Be in Love", available as free singles online.
On August 6, 2010, they released their new single The Way It Goes with a record to follow the same year.

On November 13, 2010, they announced on their Twitter that their third album, entitled TCV, will be released exclusively in Asia on November 16, 2010. Their album will be released in the UK through Lojinx and in the US on Q Dee Records, May 2011.

Break-up
The Click Five announced January 14, 2013, on their Facebook page that they have officially parted ways. They stated that they were parting ways so that they may continue to focus on their individual endeavors after a long hiatus and thanked all their fans for supporting them throughout the years.

Public image

Early in their career the band were known for their visual style. The Click Five were known for appearing in matching Mod-based sharp-looking suits and ties coupled with moptop haircuts, as well as wearing bright red collared shirts underneath. Early in their career, the band did not appear in public without their matching outfits. During this period their style was reminiscent of the Beatles and other 60s beat groups. Their look was somewhat similar to modern-day contemporaries the Strokes as well.

The band had a large audience of teenage girls. Guese remarked, "For a lot of these girls it is the first concert they have been to, or the first band they have been linked to". He also said, "Girls going crazy are better than some guy in a bar waiting to fight you outside after you're done playing".

The Boston Globe referred to their image as "fluffy teen-dream pinups". Mentzer, although defending their image, admitted that the band was perceived as "uncool".

Reviewers from USA Today and About.com criticized the band for being generally too "cutesy", "lacking of substance", "not impressive to today's generation" and "soulless". A Yahoo! Music commentator stated that it "sounds like a soundtrack to a WB show".

Influences

Band members have cited power pop leaders Cheap Trick and Matthew Sweet as major influences. They also have cited the Talking Heads as an inspiration. John D. Luerssen of Allmusic has stated that they sound similar to the Knack, the Calling, and label-mates Fountains of Wayne. Mikael Wood of Baltimore City Paper has compared the Click Five to Fall Out Boy and the All-American Rejects in terms of sound and crossover appeal. In terms of songwriting, Bill Lamb of About.com has remarked that they seem reminiscent of the Beatles and the Beach Boys. Gary Susman of Entertainment Weekly has stated their vocal harmonies are similar to Queen, but they sing more like the Backstreet Boys.

Several critics and commentators have stated that the Click Five's overall image, style, and performance is evocative of fellow Boston-based band the Cars. In general, Guese has said, "we're a rock band that plays pop songs... I have always been a fan of the three-minute pop song." He has also said, "We just try to have a lot of fun... We try to bring back that old-time rock 'n' roll sort of vibe."

Band members

Final lineup
Kyle Patrick – lead vocals and backing vocals, rhythm guitar (2007–2013)
Joe Guese – lead guitar and backing vocals (2004–2013)
Ben Romans – synthesizers and backing vocals (2004–2013)
Ethan Mentzer – bass and backing vocals (2004–2013)
Joey Zehr – drums (2004–2013)

Earlier members
Eric Dill – lead vocals and backing vocals, rhythm guitar (2004–2007)

Discography

Studio albums

EPs
 Angel to You (Devil to Me) (2005)
 Live at Bull Moose (2006)

Singles

References

External links

The Click Five Official Site

Atlantic Records artists
Musical quintets
American pop rock music groups
American power pop groups
Musical groups from Boston
Musical groups established in 2003
Musical groups disestablished in 2013
Berklee College of Music alumni
Lojinx artists